Alessandro Pesenti-Rossi (born 31 August 1942) is a former racing driver from Italy, born in Bergamo.  He participated in four Formula One World Championship Grands Prix with a privately entered Tyrrell, debuting on 1 August 1976.  He scored no championship points, but managed to finish every race that he started.

Prior to his brief time in Formula One, Pesenti-Rossi was a regular race winner in Italian Formula Three, narrowly missing the 1975 title when the final race was abandoned due to rain as he was leading it. He lost the title to Luciano Pavesi by a single point. He also fielded a private March 742 in Formula Two but with only moderate success, and it was to Formula Two that he returned in 1977.

Racing record

Complete European Formula Two Championship results
(key) (Races in bold indicate pole position; races in italics indicate fastest lap)

Complete Formula One results
(key)

References

Italian racing drivers
Italian Formula One drivers
European Formula Two Championship drivers
1942 births
Living people